Rosemary Ellen "Rosie" Smith (born 20 July 1983, London) is an English rock and metal musician, best known as the former keyboardist of the British extreme metal band Cradle of Filth, with whom she remained until 2009.

Biography
Born in London, Smith moved to Dorset at the age of twelve. She earned a music diploma at Weymouth College, where she met and joined her first band, Jacks Back. During this time she also played saxophone in a Tina Turner tribute band. At the age of twenty, she attended the University of Salford, where her next band Sugalo was formed. Soon after that she met Cradle of Filth and was suggested for audition by a mutual acquaintance.

Smith has also embarked on two projects separate to Cradle of Filth, her solo project 'Rosa Damascena' and the duo 'Robert John and Rosie Smith'. Rosa Damascena has seen the release on one EP 3 Days Before Midnight, which is her own copyrighted genre 'Gazz' (goth jazz). Robert John and Rosie Smith are currently recording their debut album, Broken Branches and both records have been recorded, mixed, mastered and produced by Smith.

Smith currently resides back in Dorset together with her fiancée and her baby daughter. She now teaches piano and is the CEO of Shooting Gallery Studios.

References 

1984 births
English heavy metal keyboardists
English rock saxophonists
English harpists
Living people
Cradle of Filth members
Alumni of the University of Salford
Women harpists
21st-century saxophonists
21st-century women musicians
Women in metal
Women saxophonists

pl:Rosie Smith